Drahomanivka was a proposed reform of the Ukrainian alphabet and orthography, promoted by Mykhailo Drahomanov.  This orthography was used in a few publications and in Drahomanov's correspondence, but due to cultural resistance and political persecution it was never able to catch on.

This phonemic orthography was developed in Kyiv in the 1870s by a group of cultural activists led by Pavlo Zhytetsky and including Drahomanov, for the compilation of a Ukrainian dictionary.  The 1876 Ems Ukaz banned Ukrainian-language publications and public performances in the Russian Empire, so cultural activity was forced to move abroad before this reform had a chance to be published.

Zhytetsky named this alphabet the Hertsehovynka, after the influence of the recent Serbian orthography of Vuk Karadžić, from Herzegovina.  But Drahomanov first used it in a publication (Hromada, Geneva 1878), and it came to be popularly referred to as the Drahomanivka.  It was used in Drahomanov's publications and personal correspondence, as well as in publications in Western Ukraine (Austro-Hungarian Galicia) by Drahomanov's colleagues Ivan Franko and Mykhailo Pavlyk (Hromadskyi Druh, Dzvin, and Molot, Lviv 1878).  But these publications were opposed by conservative Ukrainian cultural factions (the Old Ruthenians and Russophiles) and persecuted by the Polish-dominated Galician authorities, and the orthography fell into obscurity.

The alphabet

The Drahomanivka was based on the phonemic principle, with each letter representing exactly one Ukrainian phoneme (one meaningful unit of sound). The semivowel , written , was replaced with the Latin ; the sequences  were to be written  instead of with the iotified vowels . Due to these changes the hard sign—then written  but later as an apostrophe —was superfluous and to be abandoned. The verb ending ‑ться was written ‑тцьа.

Examples:
 шчука (щука in the modern orthography, ščuka, 'pike')
 јаблуко (яблуко, jabluko, 'apple')
 свьатиј (святий, svjatyj, 'saint')
 сподівајетцьа (сподівається, spodivajet'sja, 'anticipates')

An example of the use of Drahomanivka was presented on the 2003 Ukrainian twenty-hryvnia  banknote. It shows a fragment of Ivan Franko's poem "Veselka", written in the Drahomanivka, beside the poet's portrait:

External links
 Drahomanivka at the Encyclopedia of Modern Ukraine

Ukrainian orthography
Cyrillic alphabets
1870s establishments in Ukraine
Culture in Kyiv